Line 8 of the Chengdu Metro is a line on the metro network in Chengdu, Sichuan, China. The first phase opened on 18 December 2020.

The line runs from north-east to south-west and avoids the centre of Chengdu.

Opening timeline

Stations

References

Chengdu Metro lines
Railway lines opened in 2020
2020 establishments in China